Iuliana Popa (born 5 July 1996) is a Romanian rower. She competed in the women's eight event at the 2016 Summer Olympics.

References

External links
 

1996 births
Living people
Romanian female rowers
Olympic rowers of Romania
Rowers at the 2016 Summer Olympics
Olympic bronze medalists for Romania
Medalists at the 2016 Summer Olympics
Olympic medalists in rowing
Place of birth missing (living people)
World Rowing Championships medalists for Romania